Sirajuddin Khan is a Pakistani politician who was a member of the Provincial Assembly of Khyber Pakhtunkhwa from July 2019 till January 2023.

Political career
Khan contested 2019 Khyber Pakhtunkhwa provincial election on 20 July 2019 from constituency PK-102 (Bajaur-III) on the ticket of Jamaat-e-Islami Pakistan. He won the election by the majority of 5,652 votes over the runner up Hameedur Rehman of Pakistan Tehreek-e-Insaf. He garnered 19,088 votes while Rehman received 13,436 votes.

References

Living people
Jamaat-e-Islami Pakistan politicians
Politicians from Khyber Pakhtunkhwa
Year of birth missing (living people)